La Chapelle-Geneste is a commune in the Haute-Loire department in south-central France.

Geography
The Senouire flows west, then south, through the southwestern part of the commune.

Population

See also
Communes of the Haute-Loire department

References

Communes of Haute-Loire